Strumaria watermeyeri is a species of flowering plant in the family Amaryllidaceae, native to the Cape Provinces of South Africa, where it is found in dry areas in the northwest. It is usually solitary, and has pink or white flowers. It was first described by Louisa Bolus in 1921.

Subspecies
Two subspecies are recognized:
Strumaria watermeyeri subsp. botterkloofensis (D.Müll.-Doblies & U.Müll.-Doblies) Snijman
Strumaria watermeyeri subsp. watermayeri

References

watermeyeri
Flora of the Cape Provinces
Plants described in 1921